The Penguin History of Europe is a popular book series about the history of Europe, published by Penguin Books.

The series includes:
 The Birth of Classical Europe: A History from Troy to Augustine (2011) by Simon Price and Peter Thonemann
 The Inheritance of Rome: Europe 400–1000 (2010) by Chris Wickham
 Europe in the High Middle Ages (2004) by William Chester Jordan
 Renaissance Europe (Forthcoming) by Anthony Grafton
 Christendom Destroyed: Europe 1517–1648 (2015) by Mark Greengrass
 The Pursuit of Glory: Europe 1648–1815 (2008) by Tim Blanning
 The Pursuit of Power: Europe 1815–1914 (2017) by Richard J. Evans
 To Hell and Back: Europe 1914–1949 (2015) by Ian Kershaw
 The Global Age: Europe 1950–2017 (2020) by Ian Kershaw

See also
Penguin History of Britain (1996–2018)
The Oxford History of Modern Europe (1954—)

References

Series of history books
Penguin Books book series
History books about Europe